Sir Edmund Moundeford (1596 – May 1643) was an English politician who sat in the House of Commons at various times between 1628 and 1643.

Moundeford was the son of Sir Edmund Moundeford of Mundford and Hockwold, Norfolk, and his first wife Frances Gawdy, daughter of Sir Thomas Gawdy of Claxton, Norfolk. He attended school at Wymondham, Norfolk under Mr Eston and was admitted at Caius College, Cambridge on 16 January 1612 aged 16. In 1628, he was elected Member of Parliament for Thetford and sat until 1629 when King Charles I of England decided to rule without parliament for eleven years. He was knighted on 9 December 1629. He was a friend of John Winthrop and was interested in trying to found a Puritan colony in the Caribbean.

In April 1640, Moundeford was elected MP for Norfolk in the Short Parliament. He was re-elected MP for Norfolk for the Long Parliament in November 1640. He sat until his death in 1643. By deed dated 10 September 1642, he left property consisting of marsh or fen ground in Feltwell, Norfolk, to pay for clothing for the poor of the village and a free school "for the teaching the children of the inhabitants grammar and other learning, freely". There was sufficient income to pay for eight almshouses at Feltwell.

Moundeford died without issue and was buried at Feltwell on 11 May 1643. He left much of his estate to his half-sister Elizabeth.

Moundeford had four half-sisters through his father's second marriage to Abigail Knyvett, of whom Elizabeth, married firstly Miles Hobart and secondly Sir Hugh Cartwright, and Muriel married Sir Henry Clere, first and last of the Clere baronets of Ormesby. She had one surviving child, Abigail, familiar to readers of the Diary of Samuel Pepys as "Madam Williams", the mistress of his colleague William Brouncker, 2nd Viscount Brouncker. She married John Williams or Cromwell, a cousin of Oliver Cromwell.

References

 

1596 births
1643 deaths
Alumni of Gonville and Caius College, Cambridge
People from Thetford
Members of the Parliament of England for Norfolk
Members of the Parliament of England for Thetford
English MPs 1628–1629
English MPs 1640 (April)
English MPs 1640–1648